Alas the Madonna Does Not Function is a 12" EP by Nurse with Wound.

Track listing
"Nil By Mouth" – 9:47 
"Swansong" – 21:24

Nurse with Wound albums
1988 EPs